= Red Crescent Society of Turkmenistan =

Humanitarian organization in Turkmenistan

- Türkmenistanyň Gyzyl Ýarymaý Milli jemgyýeti
- Abbreviation: NRCST (National Red Crescent Society of Turkmenistan)
- Formation: 1926
- Type: National Red Crescent Society
- Purpose: Humanitarian aid, social security, disaster response, and implementation of international humanitarian law
- Headquarters: Ashgabat
- Location: Turkmenistan
- Affiliations: International Federation of Red Cross and Red Crescent Societies (IFRC); International Committee of the Red Cross (ICRC)
- Website: tgymj.gov.tm/en/

Emblem

The Red Crescent Society of Turkmenistan (Turkmen: Türkmenistanyň Gyzyl Ýarymaý Milli jemgyýeti) was established in 1926 and it has its headquarters in Ashgabat, Turkmenistan.
